Pedro da Fonseca (Latin, Petrus Fonsecae; Proença-a-Nova, 1528 – Lisbon, 4 November 1599) was a Portuguese Jesuit philosopher and theologian. His work on logic and metaphysics made him known in his time as the Portuguese Aristotle; he projected the 'Cursus Conimbricenses' realized by Manuel Góis and others.

Works
 Institutionum Dialecticarum. Lisbon: 1564.
 Commentariorum in Libros Metaphysicorum Aristotelis. Rome: 1577.
 Isagoge Philosophica. Lisbon: 1591.

See also
 Conimbricenses

External links
Pedro da Fonseca’s Isagoge Philosophica and the Predicables from Boethius to the Lovanienses João Madeira 
The Birth of Ontology. A selection of Ontologists from 1560 to 1770
Page on Instituto Camões (pt)

 Scholasticon, by Jacob Schmutz

1528 births
1599 deaths
16th-century Portuguese Jesuits
Portuguese philosophers
Portuguese theologians
Latin commentators on Aristotle
People from Proença-a-Nova
School of Salamanca